The Joseph Chamberlain Memorial Clock Tower, or colloquially Old Joe, is a clock tower and campanile located in Chancellor's court at the University of Birmingham, in the suburb of Edgbaston. It is the tallest free-standing clock tower in the world, although its actual height is the subject of some confusion.

The tower was built to commemorate Joseph Chamberlain, the first Chancellor of the University (with the commemoration being carved into the stone at the tower's base), although one of the original suggested names for the clock tower was the "Poynting Tower", after one of the earliest professors at the University, Professor John Henry Poynting. 

A prominent landmark in  Birmingham, the grade II* listed tower can be seen for miles around the campus, and has become synonymous with the University itself.

History

Designed as part of the initial phase of the Edgbaston campus by architects Aston Webb and Ingress Bell, the tower was constructed between 1900–1908, and stood at the centre of a semicircle of matching red brick buildings. The tower is modelled on the Torre del Mangia in Siena. The original tower designs were amended due to Chamberlain's great admiration for the Italian city's campanile. On 1 October 1905, the Birmingham Post reported that Chamberlain had announced to the University Council an anonymous gift of £50,000 (the donor in fact was Sir Charles Holcroft). This anonymous gift was announced some two months later in the Birmingham Post as "to be intended for the erection of a tower in connection with the new buildings at Bournbrook at a cost estimated by the architects at £25,000. In 1940, Sir Mark Oliphant used the tower for radar experiments.

However, Old Joe is still one of the fifty tallest buildings in the UK.

The asteroid 10515 Old Joe, discovered in 1989, is named in the clock tower's honour. There is a superstition that if students walk through the tower's archway when it chimes, that they will fail their degree.

Description

The clock hands are made out of sheet copper. There are ten floors served by an electrical lift in the SW corner. The tower was built from the inside, without scaffolding, up to the level of the balcony. Owing to its having been built from the inside it was not pointed and had to be pointed in 1914 and was subsequently repointed in 1957 and 1984–85. Its weight, solid brick corners linked by four courses of brick resists the overturning wind forces.

The original design for Old Joe is thought to have been based upon St Mark's Campanile in Venice, the latter having served as the inspiration for Sather Tower at University of California, Berkeley. The final design is thought to have been inspired by Torre del Mangia which is of similar design but for the clock being placed towards the bottom of the tower. 

David Lodge's novel Changing Places tells the story of exchange of professors between the universities of Rummidge and Euphoric State, Plotinus (thinly disguised fictional versions of Birmingham and Berkeley), which in the book both have replicas of the Leaning Tower of Pisa on campus.

References

General

External links

A 360° view of the Clock Tower

Towers completed in 1908
University of Birmingham
History of Birmingham, West Midlands
Bell towers in the United Kingdom
Individual clocks in England
Clock towers in the United Kingdom
Towers in the West Midlands (county)
Grade II* listed buildings in Birmingham
Memorials to Joseph Chamberlain
1908 establishments in England